Delaware Valley is the valley of the Delaware River in the northeastern United States. By extension, the toponym is commonly applied to the Philadelphia metropolitan area, which straddles the Lower Delaware Valley.

Delaware Valley may also refer to:
 Association of Delaware Valley Independent Schools
 Central Delaware Valley AVA
 Delaware Basin, a geological feature in New Mexico
 Delaware Valley accent, a dialect of the English language otherwise known as Mid-Atlantic American English
 Delaware Valley Association of Rail Passengers
 Delaware Valley Association of Structural Engineers
 Delaware Valley Friends School
 Delaware Valley High School (private school)
 Delaware Valley High School
 Delaware Valley Legacy Fund
 Delaware Valley Mantarays
 Delaware Valley Minority Student Achievement Consortium
 Delaware Valley Ornithological Club
 Delaware Valley Railway
 Delaware Valley Regional High School
 Delaware Valley Regional Planning Commission
 Delaware Valley School District
 Delaware Valley University
 Delaware Valley University station
 Head Cases: Serial Killers in the Delaware Valley
 The Delaware Valley News, former name of The Hunterdon County Democrat